Snook is an unincorporated community in Decatur Township, Mifflin County, Pennsylvania, United States.

Notes

Unincorporated communities in Mifflin County, Pennsylvania
Unincorporated communities in Pennsylvania